Cho Han-Bum (born 28 March  1985) is a South Korea football right wingback, who currently plays for Ulsan Hyundai Mipo Dockyard Dolphins FC in the Korea National League. He previously played for K-League clubs Daegu FC and the Pohang Steelers.

Club career
Having spent his youth career at Chung-Ang University, Cho's professional career began as a draft pick for the Pohang Steelers in time for the 2008 K-League season.  Remaining with the Pohang Steelers for the 2009 season, Cho saw limited matchplay.  However, during the summer transfer window, on 29 July 2009, Cho was loaned to Daegu FC. Following the end of the load period, Cho returned to the Pohang Steelers for the 2010 season, but was released at the end of year.

Club Career statistics

References

External links

1985 births
Living people
South Korean footballers
Pohang Steelers players
Daegu FC players
K League 1 players
Korea National League players

Association football defenders